Kunowsky may refer to:

 Georg Karl Friedrich Kunowsky (1786–1846), a German lawyer and amateur astronomer; and objects named after him:
 Kunowsky (lunar crater)
 Kunowsky (Martian crater)